William Haighton Turner (born 1867; date of death unknown) was a Welsh footballer who played as a forward and made five appearances for the Wales national team.

Career
Turner made his international debut for Wales on 26 February 1887 in the 1886–87 British Home Championship against England, which finished as a 0–4 away loss. He earned five caps in total for Wales, with his last appearance coming on 21 March 1891 in the 1890–91 British Home Championship against Scotland, which finished as a 3–4 home loss.

Career statistics

International

References

External links
 
 

1867 births
Date of birth missing
Year of death missing
Welsh footballers
Wales international footballers
Association football forwards
Wrexham A.F.C. players